

Events

Year overall
 New Century Comics, Disney Comics, Millennium Publications, MU Press, Tundra Publishing, Valiant Comics, Drawn & Quarterly, and the French publisher L'Association, all enter the marketplace.
 The "Days of Future Present" storyline, the sequel to "Days of Future Past," appears in the annuals of Fantastic Four, New Mutants, X-Factor and X-Men.
 The merger of Time Inc. and Warner Communications, parent of DC Comics completed, the merger name was Time Warner.

January
 January 7: In the Disney comics magazine Topolino, the first chapter of The Search for the Zodiac Stone!: An Epic Yarn of Mice and Ducks!, written by Bruno Sarda and drawn by Massimo De Vita and Franco Valussi, appears in print for the first time. The story, in 12 chapters, is considered the longest Disney comic ever published and its issue lasts the whole year. It involves all the principal characters of the Donald and Mckey universes and sees the debut of Paperinik’s nemesis Spectrus.
 Charles M. Schulz is named Commandeur des Arts et Lettres. 
Dinosaurs for Hire is cancelled by Eternity Comics with issue #9.
 1st known artwork by Dale Keown for Marvel Comics, published in Nth Man #9.

February
 The last issue of Damage Control v2 is published.
 With issue #6, Police Academy is cancelled.

March
 March 16: Jan Bucquoy launches the Belgian weekly magazine Dol/Belge, which is so outrageous in slandering media celebrities, the Belgian royal family, the Pope, politicians and other high officials that within a few weeks issues are confiscated and stores refuse to sell copies. Bucquoy then transforms it into a genuine comics magazine featuring reprints of his older porn parodies. The magazine will last merely a year.
 Elektra Lives Again is published by Epic Comics, written and drawn by Frank Miller.
 The last issue of Strikeforce: Morituri: Electric Undertow is published, thereby ending the series as a whole.
Le raid infernal, by Jean Michel Charlier and Colin Wilson, sixth chapter of La jeunesse de Blueberry; first chapter of the Great Locomotive Chase saga.

April
 April 6: The unfinished Blake and Mortimer story, The 3 Formulas of Professor Sato: Mortimer vs. Mortimer, made before Edgar P. Jacobs' death, is published posthumously, completed by Bob de Moor.

June
 With issue 9, The Destroyer v1 is cancelled.

July
 Fright Night is canceled by Now Comics with issue #22.
 The New Warriors v1 #1 is released.
 2000AD spin-off Revolver hits newsagents, with the seminal storyline Rogan Gosh.
 Shade the Changing Man is revamped by DC imprint Vertigo.

August
 August 31: Scott McCloud draws the first comic strip drawn in 24 hours. In 2004 this will become an annual event. 
 Yoshito Usui launches his series Crayon Shin-chan.  
 Animal Man #26: "Deus Ex Machina," writer Grant Morrison's final issue of Animal Man.
 Secret Origins is canceled by DC with issue #50.
 Spider-Man #1, the start of the "Torment" storyline, marked Todd McFarlane's first major outing on a series as a writer/artist. The issue would become the best selling comic book so far and be the first major step to the rise of the superstar creators and the formation of Image Comics.

September
 Nth Man: The Ultimate Ninja is canceled by Marvel with issue #16.
 Terminator is canceled by NOW Comics with issue #17.

October
 October 13: During the Stripdagen in Breda, the Netherlands, Henk Kuijpers receives the Stripschapprijs. Joost Swarte receives the Jaarprijs voor Bijzondere Verdienste (nowadays the P. Hans Frankfurtherprijs).
 Swamp Thing #100: Double-sized issue, "Tales of Eden," by Doug Wheeler, Kelley Jones, and Pat Broderick.
 The Huntress v1 is canceled by DC with issue #19.

November
 Marvel's "X-Tinction Agenda" crossover begins in the pages of Uncanny X-Men, X-Factor, and New Mutants.

December
 Fantastic Four #347 – A temporary lineup introduced, consisting of the Hulk, Spider-Man, Wolverine, and Ghost Rider.
 Wendy the Good Little Witch (1960 series), with issue #97, canceled by Harvey Comics.
 The Real Ghostbusters is canceled by Now Comics with issue #28.

Specific date unknown
 The first issue of the Belgian satirical comics and cartoons magazine Ubu-Pan is published.

Births

Deaths

January
 January 1: Charles Boost, Dutch illustrator and comics artist (drew comics for De Tijd), passes away at age 82.
 January 8: Bernard Krigstein, American comics artist (Master Race, Mad), dies at age 71.
 January 14: Bohumil Konecny, aka Bimba, Czech comics artist, painter and illustrator (Amazona, aka Octobriana), dies at age 71. 
 January 20: Claude Auclair, French comics artist  (Simon du Fleuve), dies at age 46.

February
 February 22: Thomas Ochse Honiball, South African cartoonist and comics artist (Oom Kaspaas, Jakkals en Wolf), dies at age 84.

March
 March 4: Salvatore Deidda, Italian comics artist (Stark, continued Martin Mystère), dies at age 37.
 March 12: Woody Kimbrell, American comics artist (Little Lulu), dies at age 83. 
 March 24: Ray Goulding, American comedian (Bob & Ray) and comics writer (Mad Magazine ), dies at age 68.
 March 30: João Mottini, Brazilian comics artist (Quintín Duval, continued Ellos), passes away at age 66.

April
 April 24: 
 Claude Henri, French comics writer and artist (Hourrah Freddi, Lynx Blanc, P'tit Joc, Charles Oscar), passes away at age 74.
 André Fernez, Belgian comics writer, novelist and chief editor of Tintin between 1947 and 1959, passes away at age 72.
 April 28: Edwina Dumm, American comics artist  (Cap Stubbs and Tippie) dies at age 96.

May 
 May 7: Pier Lorenzo De Vita, Italian comics artist (Tuffolino, Pecos Bill, Disney comics, Mopsi, Giso e Leo), dies at age 80.
 May 15: Porfiri Nikitich Krylov, Russian painter, illustrator and poster designer (member of the collective Kukryniksy), dies at age 87.
 May 25: William Overgard, American comics artist (continued Steve Roper and Mike Nomad and Kerry Drake), dies at age 64.
 May 31: William Timym, also known as Tim, Austrian-British animator and comics artist (The Boss, Caesar, Bengo the Boxer, Wuff, Tuff and Snuff, Bim, Bam and Boom, Oh, Johnny!, Bleep and Booster), dies at age 87.

June
 June 23: Howard Boughner, American comics artist (Mac, Hold Everything, writer of Penny and Dotty Dripple, assisted on Dumb Dora and Wash Tubbs), dies at age 81.
 June 30: Jacques Lob, French comics artist (Ténébrax, Blanche Epiphanie,  Submerman, Superdupont), dies at age 67.

July
 July 17: George Waiss, American animator and comics artist (Disney comics), dies at age 83.
 July 18: Yves Chaland, French comics artist (Freddy Lombard), dies in a car accident at age 33.
 July 18: Georges Dargaud, French comics publisher (Dargaud), passes away at age 79. 
 July 25: Sam Grainger, American comics artist (Marvel Comics), dies at age 60.

August
 August 7: Phiny Dick, Dutch comics writer and artist (Miezelientje, Olle Kapoen, Birre Beer), also wife of Marten Toonder, passes away at age 77.
 August 12: B. Kliban, American cartoonist (Playboy), dies of a pulmonary embolism at age 55.
 August 28: Willy Vandersteen, Belgian comics artist (Suske en Wiske, De Familie Snoek, De Vrolijke Bengels,  't Prinske, De Rode Ridder,  Bessy, Robert en Bertrand, De Geuzen), dies at age 77.

September
 September 5: Jerry Iger, American comics publisher (co-founder of Eisner & Iger) writer and artist, dies at age 87.
 September 20: 
 Byron Aptosoglou, Greek illustrator and comics artist (The Superman, Mikrós Íros (Little Hero), Tarzan comics), dies at age 67 or 68.
 Attilio Micheluzzi, Italian comics artist (Roy Mann, Petra Chérie, Johnny Focus), dies at age 60.

October
 October 14: Art Huhta, American comics artist (Dinky Dinkerton, Wild Rose, assisted on Mescal Ike, Lolly Gags and The Nebbs), dies at age 88.
 October 29: François Gianolla, Belgian poet, playwright, cartoonist, illustrator, musician, caricaturist and comics artist (Fred, Mile et Bob), dies at age 83.
 October 31: Roger Price, American humorist, writer, publisher and cartoonist (creator of droodles), dies at age 72.
 Specific date in October unknown: Dan DeCarlo Jr., American comic artist (Archie Comics), dies at age 52 from stomach cancer.

December
 December 21: Susi Weigel, Austrian illustrator, comics artist and animator (worked for Unsere Zeitung), dies at age 76.
 December 30: Tony Abruzzo, American comics artist (made romance comics for National Periodicals (later DC Comics), dies at age 74.

Specific date unknown
 Dennis Collins, British comics artist (The Perishers), passes away.
 Cram, Belgian cartoonist (De Weyfelaers, Jan Pech), passes away at age 51 or 52.
 Marcel Dehaye, Belgian journalist, novelist, comics writer and chief editor of Tintin (1959-1965), dies at age 82 or 83. 
 Nicholas, aka Nick Firfires, American illustrator and comics artist (made realistically drawn comics for Disney and the celebrity comic based on Gene Autry), dies at age 72 or 73.
 Harry Haenigsen, American comics artist (Penny), dies at age 89.
 Ye Hung-chia, Taiwanese comics artist (Chuko Szu-lang), dies at age 76 or 77.
 Walter Kellermann, German comics artist (Silberpfeil), dies at age 66 or 67. 
 Yu Takita, Japanese manga artist (Terajima-cho (The Terajima Neighborhood Mystery tales), dies at age 57 or 58.
 Tom, aka Thomaz de Mello, Portuguese comics artist (Rico, Pico e Sarapico), dies at age 83 or 84.

Exhibitions and shows

Conventions
 January 6–7: Great Eastern Conventions (New York City)
 January 24–28: Angoulême International Comics Festival (Angoulême, France)
 February 17–18: Motor City Comic Con (Dearborn Civic Center, Dearborn, Michigan) — guests include Erik Larsen, Gary Kwapisz, Jeff Albrecht, John Ostrander, Kim Yale, Marshall Rogers, Matt Feazell, Mike Grell, Norm Breyfogle, Rob Liefeld, and Tim Dzon
 April: Glasgow Comic Art Convention (Glasgow City Chambers, Glasgow, Scotland) — presentation of the Speakeasy Awards
 April 1: Great Eastern Conventions (Albany Marriott, Albany, New York)		
 April 8: Great Eastern Conventions (Sheraton S.F. Airport Hotel, San Francisco, California)			
 April 29: Great Eastern Conventions (Holiday Inn Ashley Plaza, Tampa, Florida)
 May 6: Great Eastern Conventions (Colony Square Hotel, Atlanta, Georgia)	
 May 12: Great Eastern Conventions (57 Park Plaza Hotel, Boston, Massachusetts)		
 Summer: FantaCon (Empire State Plaza, Albany, New York)
 June: Heroes Convention (Charlotte, North Carolina)
 June 1–3: Great Eastern Conventions (New York Penta Hotel, New York City)
 June 29–July 1: Dragon Con/Atlanta Comics Expo/Origins Game Fair (Atlanta Hilton & Towers/Atlanta Radisson Hotel, Atlanta, Georgia) — 6,900 attendees; guest of honor: Tom Clancy; other guests include Todd McFarlane, Jim Salicrup, and Bob Budiansky
 July 6–8: Chicago Comicon (Ramada O'Hare, Rosemont, Illinois) — 5,000+ attendees; featured guests: Van Williams, Gerard Christopher, Harvey Kurtzman, and Erik Larsen; other guests: Mark Gruenwald, Jim Starlin, Tom DeFalco, Len Strazewski, John Ostrander, Kim Yale, Chuck Fiala, P. Craig Russell, Charlie Athanas, Dick Locher, Max Allan Collins, Rick Obadiah, and Tony Caputo.
 July 13–15: Dallas Fantasy Fair (Dallas, Texas) — official guests include Harvey Kurtzman, Neil Gaiman, Todd Klein, Tom Orzechowski, Sergio Aragonés, Chester Brown, Bob Burden, Kurt Busiek, Will Eisner, Kerry Gammill, Gilbert Hernandez, Jaime Hernandez, Adam Hughes, Jim Lee, P. Craig Russell, Mark Schultz, Julius Schwartz, Bill Sienkiewicz, Jim Starlin, John Totleben, Bill Willingham, and Roger Zelazny
 July 13–15: Las Vegas International All Collectibles Show (Las Vegas, Nevada) — guests include Stan Lee, Todd McFarlane, and Fabian Nicieza
 August 2–5: San Diego Comic Con (Convention and Performing Arts Center and Holiday Inn, San Diego, California) — 13,000 attendees; official guests: Peter David, Will Eisner, Kelly Freas, Michael Kaluta, Mel Lazarus, Carl Macek, Grant Morrison, John Romita Jr., and Van Williams
 August 4–5: Comix Fair '90 (Holiday Inn Medical Center, Houston, Texas) — eighth annual show; guests include Bill Hinds, Jeff Millar, and Doug Hazlewood
 August 17–19: Atlanta Fantasy Fair XVI (Omni Hotel & Georgia World Congress Center, Atlanta, Georgia) — official guests include Jack Kirby, John de Lancie, Sandahl Bergman, Catherine Hicks, Julius Schwartz, Sharon Green, Linda Thorson, Martin Caidin, Greg Theakston, Boris Vallejo, and Carl Macek
 September 22–24: United Kingdom Comic Art Convention (UKCAC) (UCL Institute of Education, London, UK) — presentation of the Eagle Awards 
 October–November: FIBDA (Amadora, Portugal) — inaugural edition; guests include Morris
  October 20–21: Toronto Comic and Sequential Art Exposition (Arts, Crafts Hobbies Building, Exhibition Place, Toronto, Ontario, Canada)
 October 27–28: Killer Con (Ferndale Community Center, Ferndale, Michigan) — guests include Bill Reinhold, Mark Bagley, Sam Kieth, Keith Pollard, William Messner-Loebs, Doug Rice, Flint Henry, Chuck Dixon, Beau Smith, Gary Kwapisz, Matt Feazell, and Tim Dzon

Awards

Eisner Awards

Presented in 1991 for comics published in 1990.
 Best Story or Single Issue: Concrete Celebrates Earth Day, by Paul Chadwick, Charles Vess, and Jean "Moebius" Giraud (Dark Horse)
 Best Continuing Series: Sandman, by Neil Gaiman and various artists (DC)
 Best Black and White Series: Xenozoic Tales, by Mark Schultz (Kitchen Sink)
 Best Finite Series: Give Me Liberty, by Frank Miller and Dave Gibbons (Dark Horse)
 Best Graphic Album—New: Elektra Lives Again, by Frank Miller and Lynn Varley (Marvel)
 Best Graphic Album—Reprint: Sandman: The Doll's House by Neil Gaiman and various artists (DC)
 Best Writer: Neil Gaiman, Sandman (DC)
 Best Writer/Artist or Writer/Artist Team: Frank Miller and Geof Darrow, Hard Boiled
 Best Artist: Steve Rude, Nexus
 Best Inker: Al Williamson
 Hall of Fame: R. Crumb, Alex Toth

Zine Zone Awards 
For independent and small-press comics; presented in June 1990 by Zine Zone chairperson Terry Hooper. (Zine Zone was based in Bristol, UK.)
 Best Science Fiction Writer: Tom Elmes
 Best Science Fiction Artist: Petri Hiltinen
 Best Science Fiction Zine: Tahti Vaeltaja (Finland)
 Best Horror Writer: Rob Gott
 Best Horror Artist: David Stephenson
 Best Horror Zine: Lippe 10 (Germany)
 Best Adventure Writer: Ludwig Kreutzner
 Best Adventure Artist: Rudolph Perez
 Best Adventure Zine: Zebra (Germany)
 Best Funny Animal Comic: Blues Bar by Bernd Gronenberg (Germany)
 Best Action Comic: Stormwatcher by Ian Abbinnett and Alan Cowsill (UK)
 Best Erotic Comic: Johnny Condom by Steve Harrison (UK)
 Best Slice of Life Comic: Love and Rockets
 Best Text Feature: Small Press World by Hal Hargit (Amazing Heroes)
 Journal Most Helpful to Small Press: Amazing Heroes
 Best Indie/Small Press Journal: Comics F/X
 Best Column: Trade Secrets by Kyle Miller
 Best Original Strip: The Desert Peach by Donna Barr
 Best Humor Writer: Donna Barr
 Best Packaged Title: Kannus (Finland)
 Best Mini-Comic: Testosterone City by Peter Bagge
 Best Indie Artist: Matt "D'Israeli" Brooker
 Best Small Press Album: Heroes from the Black Lagoon (Germany)
 Best European Artist: Martin Frei (Germany)
 Most Promising Newcomer: Terry Ford (UK)
 Person Doing the Most for UK Comics History: Denis Gifford
 Greatest Influence in Comics: Jack Kirby

First issues by title

DC Comics
Justice League Quarterly
 Release: Winter.

Superboy v2
 Release: February

Limited series
The Atlantis Chronicles
 Release: March. Writer: Peter David. Artist: Esteban Maroto.

The Books of Magic v1
 Release: Writer: Neil Gaiman. Artists: John Bolton, Scott Hampton, Charles Vess & Paul Johnson.

Breathtaker
 Release: July Writer: Mark Wheatley. Artist: Marc Hempel.

Hawkworld (3 issues, later became an ongoing)
 Release: June. Writers: John Ostrander and Timothy Truman. Artist: Graham Nolan.

Twilight
 Release: December. Writers: Howard Chaykin. Artist: José Luis García-López.

World Without End
 Release: January. Writers: Jamie Delano. Artist: John Higgins.

One-shots
Batman: Digital Justice
 Release: 1990 Writer/Artist: Pepe Moreno.

Marvel Comics
Camp Candy
 Release: May.

Ghost Rider v2
 Release: May. Writer: Howard Mackie. Artists: Javier Saltares & Mark Texeira.

Guardians of the Galaxy v1
 Release: June.

Knights of Pendragon
 Release: July by Marvel UK. Writers: Dan Abnett and John Tomlinson. Artist: Gary Erskine.

Spider-Man
 Release: August. Writer & Artist: Todd McFarlane
 Issued with regular and silver ink covers, second printing with gold ink cover.

RoboCop
 Release: March. Writer: Alan Grant. Artists: Lee Sullivan & Kim DeMulder.

Marvel Super-Heroes v2
 Release: May.

Mighty Mouse
 Release: October.

Namor the Sub-Mariner
 Release: April

New Warriors
 Release: July. Writer: Fabian Nicieza. Artists: Mark Bagley & Al Williamson.

Nomad
 Release: November. Writer: Fabian Nicieza. Artists: James Fry & Mark McKenna.

Tomorrow Knights
 Release: June by Epic Comics.

Zorro
 Release: December.

Limited Series
Alien Legion: On The Edge
 Release: November.

Atomic Age
 Release: November by Epic Comics. Writer: Frank Lovece. Artists: Mike Okamoto & Al Williamson.

Black Knight
 Release: June.

Brute Force

Cadillacs and Dinosaurs
 Release: November by Epic Comics.

Darkman v1
 Release: August.

Deathlok v1
 Release: July.

Critical Mass
 Release: January by Epic Comics. Writer: D. G. Chichester and Margaret Clark.

Elsewhere Prince
 Release: May by Epic Comics. Writer/Artist: Moebius.

Fafhrd and the Gray Mouser
 Release: October by Epic Comics. Writer: Howard Chaykin. Artist: Mike Mignola.

Foolkiller v1
 Release: October.

Hero: Warrior of the Mystic Realms
 Release: May.

Hollywood Superstars
 Release: November by Epic Comics. Writer: Mark Evanier. Artist: Dan Spiegle.

Impossible Man Summer Vacation Spectacular
 Release: August

The Last American
 Release: December by Epic Comics. Writers: John Wagner & Alan Grant. Artist: Mike McMahon.

New Adventures of Cholly & Flytrap
 Release: December by Epic Comics.

Punisher Armory
 Release: July. Writer:

RoboCop 2
 Release: August.

Saga of the Original Human Torch
 Release: April. Writer: Roy Thomas.

X-Men Spotlight On... Starjammers
 Release: May

Stalkers
 Release: April

Steeltown Rockers
 Release: April. Writer: Elaine Lee. Artist: Steve Leialoha.

The Thanos Quest
 Release: September. Writer: Jim Starlin. Artist: Ron Lim.

One-shots
The Return of Shang-Chi, Master of Kung Fu: Bleeding Black
 Release: February.

Shogakukan
Basara
 Release: September on Betsucomi. Author: Yumi Tamura.

Independent titles
Classics Illustrated v2

Criminal Macabre: A Cal McDonald Mystery
 Release:

Hate
 Release: April by Fantagraphics. Writer/Artist: Peter Bagge.

Judge Dredd Megazine
 Release: October by Egmont UK.

Logan's Run
 Release:

Limited series
Big Numbers (2 issues before cancellation)
 Release: April by Mad Love. Writer: Alan Moore Artist: Bill Sienkiewicz.

Bratpack
 Release: August by King Hell Press. Writer & artist: Rick Veitch.

Cages
 Release: December by Tundra Publishing. Writer/Artist: Dave McKean.

Give Me Liberty
 Release: June. Writer: Frank Miller. Artist: Dave Gibbons.

Hard Boiled
 Release: September. Writer: Frank Miller. Artist: Geoff Darrow.

The Men In Black v1
 Release: January. Writer: Lowell Cunningham. Artist: Sandy Carruthers

Terminator: The Burning Earth
 Release: March. Writer: Ron Fortier. Artist: Alex Ross.

The Terminator: Tempest
 Release: August by Dark Horse Comics.

Initial appearance by character name

DC Comics
 Atlan in The Atlantis Chronicles #5 (July )
 Atom IV in Suicide Squad #44 (August )
 Auberon in The Sandman #19 (September )
 The Beefeater in Justice League Europe #20 (November )
 Blaze in Action Comics #655 (July )
 Crimesmith II in Batman #443 (January )
 Danny the Street in Doom Patrol v2 #35 (August )
 Delirium in The Sandman #21 (December )
 Doctor Diehard in Justice League Europe #15 (June )
 Jack Drake in Batman #455 (October )
 Tim Drake as Robin III in Batman #442 (January )
 Dreamslayer in Justice League Europe #15 (June )
 Dybbuk in Suicide Squad #45 (September )
 Echo III in Justice League Quarterly #1 (Winter)
 Firestorm II in Firestorm the Nuclear Man v2 #100 (August )
 Laurel Gand in Legion of Super-Heroes v4 #5 (March )
 Gorgon in Justice League Europe #15 (June )
 Hank Henshaw in Adventures of Superman #465 (April )
 Timothy Hunter in The Books of Magic v1 #1
 Willoughby Kipling in Doom Patrol v2 #31 (April )
 Legion (DC Comics) in Green Lantern: Emerald Dawn #2 (January )
 Manfred Mota in The Flash 50th Anniversary Special
 Neon (comics) in Legion of Super-Heroes v4 #6 (April )
 NKVDemon in Batman #445 (March )
 'The Orishas in Firestorm the Nuclear Man v2 #95 (March )
 Reflex in Legion of Super-Heroes v4 #6 (April )
 Kent Shakespeare in Legion of Super-Heroes v4 #12 (December )
 Titania in The Sandman #19 (September )
 Tracer in Justice League Europe #16 (July )
 Trinity in New Titans Annual #6
 Yuga Khan in New Gods v3 #17 (June )

Marvel Comics
 Abominatrix in Sensational She-Hulk #21 (November )
 Agamemnon in The Incredible Hulk (December )
 Ahab (comics) in Fantastic Four Annual #23
 Blackout II in Ghost Rider v2 #2 (June )
 Bliss in Uncanny X-Men #261 (May)
 Bloodlust I in Marvel Comics Presents #48 (April )
 Bloodwraith in Black Knight #2 (July )
 Cable in New Mutants #87 (March )
 Captain Atlas in Quasar #9 (April )
 Cardiac in The Amazing Spider-Man #342 (December )
 Deathlok III in Deathlok #1 (July )
 Deathwatch in Ghost Rider v2 #1 (May)
 Dittomaster in Damage Control v2 #4 (February )
 Stacey Dolan in Ghost Rider v2 #1 (May)
 Jack D'Uria in Ghost Rider v2 #4 (Aug)
 Kearson DeWitt in Iron Man Annual #13 (July )
 Foolkiller III in Foolkiller v1 #1 (October )
 Gambit in Uncanny X-Men Annual #14
 Ghost Rider II in Ghost Rider v2 #1 (May)
 The Lifeform in Punisher Annual #3
 Midnight's Fire in New Warriors #2 (August )
 Mindblast in The Amazing Spider-Man #340 (October )
 The Monster Pretenders in The Transformers #67 (June )
 Julius Rassitano in The Mighty Thor v1 #426 (November )
 The Mutant Liberation Front in The New Mutants #86 (February ) (all members appeared at the date mentioned, except where noted. otherwise)
 Dragoness in New Mutants #93 (September )
 Forearm
 Kamikaze in New Mutants #93 (September )
 Reaper
 Strobe
 Stryfe
 Tempo
 Thumbelina
 Wildside
 Zero
 Psionex in New Warriors #4 (October )
 Asylum I
 Coronary
 Dwight Hubbard
 Heidi P. Franklin
 Mathemanic
 Silhouette in New Warriors #2 (August)
 Whiplash II in Marvel Comics Presents #46 (May)

Independent titles
 Armoured Gideon in 2000AD (March 24)
 Garganta in Femforce #30
 Madman in Creatures of the Id (October)

Newspapers
 Peggy Jean in Peanuts (July 23)
 The Teenage Mutant Ninja Turtles (December 10)

References